Dôme des Sonnailles is a mountain of Savoie, France. It lies in the Massif de la Vanoise range. It has an elevation of 3,361 metres above sea level.

Alpine three-thousanders
Mountains of the Alps
Mountains of Savoie